Events from the year 1905 in Taiwan, Empire of Japan.

Incumbents

Central government of Japan
 Prime Minister: Katsura Tarō

Taiwan 
 Governor-General – Kodama Gentarō

Events

March
 26 March
 The opening of Changhua Station in Taichū Prefecture.
 The opening of Huatan Station in Taichū Prefecture.

May
 15 May
 The opening of Chenggong Station in Taichū Prefecture.
 The opening of Taichung TRA station in Taichū Prefecture.

References

 
Years of the 20th century in Taiwan